In the Aeneid, Achates (Ancient Greek: Ἀχάτης, "good, faithful Achates", fidus Achates as he was called) was a close friend of Aeneas; his name became a by-word for a very intimate companion.

Mythology 
Achates accompanied Aeneas throughout his adventures, reaching Carthage with him in disguise when the pair were scouting the area, and leading him to the Sibyl of Cumae.  Virgil represents him as remarkable for his fidelity, and a perennial type of that virtue. However, despite being Aeneas's most important Trojan, he is notable for his lack of character development.  In fact, he has only four spoken lines in the entire epic. Aeneas, surrounded by only a shadowy cast of allies, is thus emphasised as the lone protagonist and at the same time cut off from help on his quest.

Gallery

Notes

References 

 Publius Ovidius Naso, Fasti translated by James G. Frazer. Online version at the Topos Text Project.
 Publius Ovidius Naso, Fasti. Sir James George Frazer. London; Cambridge, MA. William Heinemann Ltd.; Harvard University Press. 1933. Latin text available at the Perseus Digital Library.
 Publius Vergilius Maro, Aeneid. Theodore C. Williams. trans. Boston. Houghton Mifflin Co. 1910. Online version at the Perseus Digital Library.
 Publius Vergilius Maro, Bucolics, Aeneid, and Georgics. J. B. Greenough. Boston. Ginn & Co. 1900. Latin text available at the Perseus Digital Library.

Characters in the Aeneid

Characters in Roman mythology
Trojans